Heteroteuthis is a genus of deep-sea bobtail squid comprising five species.

Species
Genus Heteroteuthis
Subgenus Heteroteuthis
Heteroteuthis dispar, Odd Bobtail
Heteroteuthis weberi
Subgenus Stephanoteuthis
Heteroteuthis dagamensis
Heteroteuthis hawaiiensis
Heteroteuthis serventyi

External links

 Tree of Life: Heteroteuthis

Bobtail squid
Cephalopod genera
Taxa named by John Edward Gray